Euriphene abasa, the black nymph, is a butterfly in the family Nymphalidae. It is found in eastern Nigeria, Cameroon, Gabon, the Republic of the Congo and the Democratic Republic of the Congo (Équateur). The habitat consists of wet forests.

References

Butterflies described in 1866
Euriphene
Butterflies of Africa
Taxa named by William Chapman Hewitson